Kurt Benkert (born July 17, 1995) is an American football quarterback who is a free agent. He played college football at East Carolina and Virginia. He originally signed with the Atlanta Falcons as an undrafted free agent in 2018, and was also a member of the Green Bay Packers and San Francisco 49ers. The Houston Roughnecks of the XFL have his rights for the 2023 XFL season, but after he was assigned to the team, he announced he would not play for the league.

Early years
Benkert attended Cape Coral High School in Cape Coral, Florida and transferred to Island Coast High School in Cape Coral prior to his senior year. As a senior, he passed for 2,261 yards with 20 touchdowns. He committed to East Carolina University to play college football.

College career
After redshirting his first year at East Carolina in 2013, Benkert appeared in three games in 2014, completing eight of 10 passes for 58 yards and an interception. He was named East Carolina's starting quarterback heading into 2015, however he suffered a torn ACL before the season. In May 2016, he transferred to the University of Virginia.

In his first year at Virginia, Benkert was named the starting quarterback. He completed 228 of 406 passes for 2,552 yards, 21 touchdowns and 11 interceptions. In the third game of his senior season in 2017, Benkert broke the school record for passing yards in a game with 455.

Professional career

Atlanta Falcons
Benkert signed with the Atlanta Falcons as an undrafted free agent on May 1, 2018. He was waived on September 1, 2018, and was signed to the practice squad the next day. He signed a reserve/future contract with the Falcons on December 31, 2018.

On August 6, 2019, Benkert was placed on injured reserve after suffering a toe injury in the preseason.

On September 5, 2020, Benkert was waived by the Falcons and was signed to the practice squad the next day. He was elevated to the active roster on November 21 for the team's week 11 game against the New Orleans Saints, and reverted to the practice squad after the game. He signed a reserve/future contract on January 4, 2021, but was waived on February 18, 2021.

Green Bay Packers
On May 17, 2021, Benkert signed with the Green Bay Packers. On August 31, 2021, Packers released Benkert as part of their final roster cuts. He was signed to the practice squad the next day. Benkert was elevated to the active roster on December 7, 2021, to replace Jordan Love, who had been placed on the reserve/COVID-19 list the day before. He saw the field for the first time in his professional career on December 12, kneeling the ball twice in the closing seconds of a 45–30 win over the Chicago Bears. 

On January 25, 2022, he signed a reserve/future contract with the Packers. On June 17, Benkert was released by the Packers.

San Francisco 49ers
On September 20, 2022, Benkert signed with the San Francisco 49ers practice squad. He was released on October 12. He re-signed to the team’s practice squad on October 18, 2022. On November 15, 2022, Benkert was released from the team again.

Houston Roughnecks
On December 12, 2022, Benkert was assigned to the Houston Roughnecks of the XFL. In a public statement, Benkert stated that, after initially seeking to join the league, he had chosen not to sign a contract, stating that it "no longer feels like the right (opportunity) to pursue" and that the decision was "the fault of no one..." with Benkert stating he would instead spend spring 2023 out of football with his family. The Roughnecks will retain his rights should he choose to join the league.

NFL career statistics

Regular season

Esports career
Benkert signed with Spacestation Gaming. He is alternate for Spacestation Gaming Halo team.

Personal life
Benkert married Samantha Morreal on July 2, 2016.

References

External links
Virginia Cavaliers bio

1995 births
Living people
American football quarterbacks
Atlanta Falcons players
Green Bay Packers players
San Francisco 49ers players
East Carolina Pirates football players
People from Cape Coral, Florida
Players of American football from Florida
Virginia Cavaliers football players
Twitch (service) streamers